AAA vs. Elite (stylized as AAA vs. ELITE) was a major professional wrestling event produced and scripted by the Mexican professional wrestling promotion Lucha Libre AAA Worldwide (AAA) and Lucha Libre Elite. It took place on July 21, 2018 in the Gimnasio Olímpico Juan de la Barrera in Mexico City, Mexico.

Production

Background
On June 26, 2018 it was announced that the Lucha Libre AAA Worldwide and Lucha Libre Elite had reached an agreement to hold events of wrestling in June 2018. In addition, fans were invited to attend dressed in red in case of supporting the fighters of AAA and blue if they are on the side of ELITE.

Storylines
The event will feature six professional wrestling matches with different wrestlers involved in pre-existing, scripted feuds, plots, and storylines. Wrestlers portray as either heels (referred to as rudos in Mexico, those that portray the "bad guys") or faces (técnicos in Mexico, the "good guy" characters) as they followed a series of tension-building events, which culminate in a wrestling match or series of matches.

Matches

See also
2018 in professional wrestling

References

2018 in professional wrestling
2018 in Mexico
Events in Mexico City
July 2018 events in Mexico
Professional wrestling joint events